is a train station located in Shimabara, Nagasaki Prefecture, Japan. It is on the Shimabara Railway Line which is operated by the third-sector Shimabara Railway.

It is the southernmost station and terminus after the Southern Line branch was closed in April 2008 due to declining ridership and maintenance costs.

Lines 
 Shimabara Railway
 Shimabara Railway Line

It is 43.2 km from Isahaya. Local and express services stop at the station.

Station layout 
The station consists of a ground-level platform with a single bi-directional track.

Adjacent stations

Gallery

See also 
 List of railway stations in Japan

References 
This article incorporates material from the corresponding article in the Japanese Wikipedia.

External links 
 
  
 Navitime station timetable 
 Yahoo! Transit Japan 

Railway stations in Japan opened in 1960
Railway stations in Nagasaki Prefecture
Stations of Shimabara Railway